Our Everyday Life is a 2015 Bosnian drama film directed by Ines Tanović. It was selected as the Bosnian entry for the Best Foreign Language Film at the 88th Academy Awards but it was not nominated.

Cast
 Uliks Fehmiu as Saša
 Mediha Musliović as Sabina
 Goran Navojec as Hike
 Emir Hadžihafizbegović as Muhamed
 Maja Izetbegović as Lejla
 Goran Bogdan as Damir
 Boro Stjepanović as Aljo
 Enis Bešlagić as Hare
 Aleksandar Seksan as Slaviša
 Mirvad Kurić as Etko
 Moamer Kasumović as Malik

See also
 List of submissions to the 88th Academy Awards for Best Foreign Language Film
 List of Bosnian submissions for the Academy Award for Best Foreign Language Film

References

External links
 

2015 films
2015 drama films
Bosnian-language films
Bosnia and Herzegovina drama films